Brittany Dawn Eva Habing (born ) is a Canadian female volleyball player. She is part of the Canada women's national volleyball team.

She participated in the 2015 FIVB Volleyball World Grand Prix.
On club level she played for University of Manitoba in 2015.

References

External links
 Profile at FIVB.org

1992 births
Living people
Canadian women's volleyball players
Place of birth missing (living people)
Manitoba Bisons players
Setters (volleyball)